Aontacht Éireann was an Irish political party founded by Kevin Boland, a former Fianna Fáil government minister and advocate of Irish republicanism. The party mainly operated within the Republic of Ireland.

Boland resigned from Dáil Éireann on 3 November 1970 rather than support a motion of confidence in Taoiseach Jack Lynch, who had sacked ministers Neil Blaney and Charles Haughey for their refusal to support Government policy on Northern Ireland amid allegations of misuse of aid to Northern Ireland during the Arms Crisis. In May 1971, Boland resigned from Fianna Fáil; on 19 September 1971, he launched the new party before an audience of over one thousand delegates.

Seán Sherwin, Fianna Fáil TD for Dublin South-West, was the only serving member of the Dáil to join Aontacht Éireann. Sherwin would later return to Fianna Fáil and serve as its National Organiser. Boland tried to persuade Fianna Fáil dissidents Neil Blaney, Paudge Brennan and Des Foley to join his party, but they remained within Fianna Fáil, contesting the 1973 general election as independents. Captain James Kelly, who was implicated and then cleared in the Arms Trial, became Vice-Chairman of Aontacht Éireann.

The party supported Northern Ireland's republicans more vehemently than Fianna Fáil. It was described by Boland as "a return to what Fianna Fáil was when it was set up to subvert the Free State". At the 1973 general election, Boland, Sherwin and eleven other candidates stood for Dáil Éireann under the Aontacht Éireann banner. None was successful and the party received less than 1% of the total national vote. Boland himself won only 6% of the vote in his constituency, Dublin County South. The party briefly had local representation, with Gerry Carroll serving as a member of Cork City Council.

Boland and most of the original members of the party resigned in 1976 after it was taken over by a number of far-right individuals. The party was essentially defunct by the time it was formally wound up in 1984.

Notes

References
 Barberis, Peter, John McHugh and Mike Tyldesley, 2005. Encyclopedia of British and Irish Political Organisations. London: Continuum International Publishing Group. , 
 Gallagher, Michael, 1985. Political Parties in the Republic of Ireland. Manchester: Manchester University Press. , 
 Captain James J Kelly: A brief biography
 Elections Ireland (incomplete record of AE election candidates)

1971 establishments in Ireland
1984 disestablishments in Ireland
Defunct political parties in the Republic of Ireland
Irish republican parties
Political parties established in 1971
Political parties disestablished in 1984